The legality of the Israeli occupation of Palestine, which has continued since 1967 and is the longest military occupation in modern history, is a subject that has received much less attention than violations of international humanitarian law (IHL) and international human rights law (IHRL) that have occurred during the occupation. Multiple United Nations General Assembly resolutions have described the continuing occupation as illegal. The general thrust of international law scholarship addressing this question has concluded that, regardless of whether it was initially legal, the occupation has become illegal over time. Reasons cited for its illegality include use of force for impermissible purposes such as annexation, violation of the Palestinian right to self-determination, that the occupation itself is an illegal regime "of alien subjugation, domination and exploitation", or some combination of these factors. Eyal Benvenisti suggested that refusal by an occupier to engage in good faith with efforts to reach a peaceful solution should not only be considered illegal but as outright annexation. International law scholar Ralph Wilde states that "The common way of understanding the extended duration of the occupation... is a prolonged violation of international law". However, Israel denies that it is occupying Palestine and maintains that its presence is legal.

On 20 October 2022, the Permanent United Nations Fact Finding Mission on the Israel Palestine conflict released a report to the United Nations General Assembly, calling on the Security Council to end Israel’s "permanent occupation" and on individual UN member states to prosecute Israeli officials. The report found "reasonable grounds" to conclude that the occupation "is now unlawful under international law due to its permanence" and Israel's "de-facto annexation policies." Israeli prime minister Yair Lapid said the report is "biased, false, inciting and blatantly unbalanced" and tweeted that "Not all criticism of Israel is anti-Semitism, but this report was written by anti-Semites … and is a distinctly anti-Semitic report". The International Court of Justice (ICJ) accepted a request from the United Nations (UN) as to the Legal consequences arising from the policies and practices of Israel in the occupied Palestinian territory including East Jerusalem. The court has set 25 July 2023 for presentation of written statements and 25 October 2023 for subsequent written comments on the statements.

Background
The Israeli occupation of Palestine began in 1967 is the longest military occupation in modern history. Since the Israeli disengagement from Gaza in 2005, it is the prevailing opinion that Gaza is still under occupation according to international law; the Israeli occupation of the West Bank is an ongoing occupation. Israel has argued that its rule in the Palestine is not occupation, but also because neither the Hague Regulations nor the GCIV limits the duration of the occupation or requires the occupant to restore the territories to the sovereign before a peace treaty is signed, cites traditional occupation law as justification for the legality of its actions. According to many interpretations, Israel has purportedly annexed parts of Palestine, including East Jerusalem, but such annexation is illegal under international law under the prohibition on the acquisition of territory through force. Its treatment of other areas of the West Bank has been described as a de facto annexation and "creeping annexation" showing an ultimate intention to permanently take over the territory. The first report of the Permanent United Nations Fact Finding Mission on the Israel Palestine conflict released on 7 June 2022, said that the root cause of the problems lay in "perpetual occupation" with no intent to end it and that Israel wanted "complete control" over the occupied area. On 11 November 2022, the United Nations General Assembly Fourth Committee passed a resolution 98 to 17 with 52 abstentions to request an International Court of Justice opinion on how "Israeli policies and practices "affect the legal status of the occupation, and what are the legal consequences that arise for all states and the United Nations from this status." The resolution, condemned by Israel, will go for a final assembly vote before the end of the year.

Use of force
According to international law, annexation is not an acceptable motive for the use of force in international law, nor is it legal to acquire territory through the use of force. An occupation maintained for the purpose of territorial aggrandizement is no different from an explicit annexation according to international law—both are illegal. Israel therefore may not annex the Palestinian territories, nor may it continue the occupation because of desire to incorporate these territories. Israel states that the occupation is justified as self-defense, but there has been little legal analysis of the occupation in relation to laws governing the use of force. For the occupation to be legal, it would need to be a justified and proportional use of force when it began and continuously from 1967 to the present,  in self-defense of the original threat or a comparable threat. The legality of using force in self-defense against non-state actors is disputed. Many international law experts and states doubt that extended occupations can ever be legal according to international law. Illegal occupation constitutes an act of aggression in international law and could also be a crime of aggression.

Some commentators have proposed that an occupation that is initially legal will remain so until a peace treaty is signed. A peace treaty however is not synonymous with the absence of a threat justifying the use of force in self-defense, without which military aggression becomes illegal. According to Wilde, "it is not credible to regard the occupation as a necessary and proportionate means of ensuring Israel’s security" and therefore, the continuation of the occupation "has been and is unlawful under the law on the use of force". Many United Nations General Assembly resolutions have condemned the Israeli occupation of Palestine as a violation of international law and the Charter of the United Nations.

Self-determination
The Palestinian right to self-determination is internationally recognized. Regardless of whether a Palestinian state currently exists, the sovereignty in the occupied Palestinian territories belongs to the Palestinian people. International law scholar Ralph Wilde states, "given that the Palestinian people have not agreed that all or part of the oPt is to be Israeli territory, the default requirement of the law of self-determination is that they should be immediately freed from the impediments to self-rule", including a speedy end to the occupation.

Other legal frameworks
The question of the legality of the occupation is largely separate from violations of international humanitarian law (IHL) and international human rights law (IHRL) that have occurred during the occupation. It is also separate from international criminal law including the occurrence of war crimes and the argument that Israel's policies constitute a crime of apartheid. According to Wilde, these violations of jus in bello "just aggravate the illegality" of the occupation. Valentina Azarova writes that systematic violations of IHL and human rights are intertwined with the issue of prolonged occupation. Azarova also suggested that unlawfully prolonged occupations can also "be treated as manifestations of outlawed colonial practices of foreign
domination, political subjugation, and economic exploitation". An interpretive statement issued by the United Nations Human Rights Committee ruled that acts of aggression occasioning loss of life inherently violate the right to life guaranteed by the International Covenant on Civil and Political Rights.

Occupation law, as a branch of IHL, regulates the conduct of occupation but does not address the question of the legality of the occupation itself. In a 2005 paper, Orna Ben-Naftali, Aeyal Gross, and Keren Michaeli argue that because occupation is intended to be temporary, a prolonged occupation would inherently violate occupation law. They rate the Israeli occupation of Palestine as illegal for this reason and others. According to Gross, a prolonged occupation also undermines the rule that sovereignty may not derive from occupation.

Overall assessments
In European Journal of International Law, Ardi Imseis argues that "Israel’s occupation has become illegal over time for being in violation of three jus cogens norms of international law: the prohibition on the acquisition of territory through force, the obligation to respect the right of peoples to self-determination and the obligation to refrain from imposing regimes of alien subjugation, domination and exploitation inimical to humankind, including racial discrimination".

In 2017, Michael Lynk, United Nations Special Rapporteur on the occupied Palestinian territories, said that the Israeli occupation was illegal. His successor, Francesca Albanese, said that the occupation crossed a "red line of legality" because "according to international law, occupation is to be temporary, justified by military necessity and in the interest of the occupied people".

Consequences
According to Azarova, "Since the very presence of such occupying states in the occupied territory presents a threat to the indigenous civilian population of the occupied territory, the principal task of international law is to eliminate such unlawful situations through restitution of the occupied territory to the status quo ante bellum". Azarova has encouraged European Union policymakers to uphold the legal obligation of non-recognition of violations of international law—including Israel's de facto annexation of the West Bank—and to "rethink a failed peace-making model".

Imseis states that if the occupation is an internationally wrongful act, an immediate end to the wrong—rather than waiting for a negotiated compromise—would be the correct solution according to international law on state responsibility. Conducting negotiations while the illegal occupation is maintained, in his view, "could be abused by the more powerful party to consolidate its illegal actions under a cloak of legitimacy provided by the UN". According to the principle of ex injuria jus non oritur, the violator of international law may not derive a benefit from its violations.

Focus on the methods of occupation and individual IHL and IHRL has been criticized for overlooking the larger question of whether the occupation itself is legal, or even legitimizing the occupation itself. The overall focus on the occupation has been criticized by Wilde and Hani Sayed as reinforcing the two-state solution paradigm, and erasing important political questions such as the consequences of the 1948 Palestinian exodus, Palestinian refugees, the status of Palestinian residents of Israel, and other issues relevant to the Israel–Palestinian conflict.

See also 
International law and the Arab–Israeli conflict

References

Citations

Sources

Further reading

External links
The International Community and Israel: Giving Permission to a Permanent Occupation

Legality of wars
Israeli-occupied territories
Israeli occupation of the West Bank